This is a list of properties and districts in Crawford County, Georgia that are listed on the National Register of Historic Places (NRHP).

Current listings

|}

References

Crawford
Buildings and structures in Crawford County, Georgia